Tsybulenko is a surname of Ukrainian origin. The surname, Tsybulenko, was created by adding the Ukrainian patronimic suffix, -enko, to word ( — onion).

People
 Evhen Tsybulenko (born 1972), Ukrainian-Estonian professor of international law
 Mykola Tsybulenko (1942–1998), Ukrainian major general
 Viktor Tsybulenko (born 1930), Ukrainian javelin thrower
 Viktoriia Tsybulenko (born 1978), Ukrainian handball player

See also
 

Ukrainian-language surnames